Lake Massawippi is a freshwater lake in Memphrémagog Regional County Municipality in the Estrie region of Quebec, Canada. The Tomifobia River is the source of the lake at its southern tip, near the village of Ayer's Cliff, Quebec. In early records, the lake was also called "Lake Tomifobi". The current of the lake flows north, funneling into the Massawippi River at the village of North Hatley, Quebec on Massawippi's northern shore.

It is bordered by five municipalities: North Hatley, Hatley Township, the municipality of Hatley, Ayer's Cliff and Sainte-Catherine-de-Hatley.

Massawippi is an Abenaki word that translates to "the big deep lake" in English.

Leisure

A popular summer destination for wealthy Americans in the late-19th and early-20th centuries, industrialist Foxhall P. Keene, writer Upton Sinclair, and the Barron family (of Barron's Magazine) were among those who owned seasonal estates on the lake.

Today Lake Massawippi is the site of two luxury hotels — Hovey Manor and the Ripplecove Inn.

In 2003, French President Jacques Chirac spent his summer holiday on the lake at the Hatley Inn, a luxury hotel renowned for its gastronomy that has since burnt down. In recent years, American President Bill Clinton has been a frequent visitor.

References

See also
Tomifobia River
Massawippi River
Memphrémagog Regional County Municipality (RCM)

Massawippi
Tributaries of the Saint Lawrence River
Tourist attractions in Estrie